Cape Sheridan is on the northeastern coast of Ellesmere Island, Canada situated on the Lincoln Sea in the Arctic Ocean, on the mouth of Sheridan River, west bank. It is one of the closest points of land to the geographic North Pole, approx  to the north, Cape Columbia is however some  closer to the Pole.

Cape Sheridan was the wintering site of Robert Peary's final quest to reach the north pole in 1908/1909; the Cape Sheridan Depot being located there.

Headlands of Qikiqtaaluk Region
Ellesmere Island